Brian Campion (born 1984) is an Irish hurler who played as a goalkeeper, corner-back, full-back, wing-back and centre-back for the Laois senior team.

Born in Rathdowney, County Laois, Campion first played competitive hurling during his schooling at St. Fergal's College. He arrived on the inter-county scene as a member of the minor team before later joining the under-21 side. He made his senior debut during the 2005 championship. Campion immediately became a regular member of the starting fifteen and won one National League (Division 2) medal.

At international level Campion played for the composite rules shinty-hurling team at under-21 level in 2005. He was a member of the Leinster inter-provincial team on a number of occasions, however, he never won a Railway Cup medal. At club level Campion is a three-time championship medallist with Rathdowney–Errill.

Throughout his career Campion made 28 championship appearances. He announced his retirement from inter-county hurling on 12 January 2015.

Honours

Team

Rathdowney-Errill
Laois Senior Hurling Championship (5): 2006, 2008, 2010, 2012, 2014

Laois
National Hurling League (Division 2) (1): 2007

References

1984 births
Living people
UCD hurlers
Rathdowney-Errill hurlers
Laois inter-county hurlers
Leinster inter-provincial hurlers
Hurling goalkeepers
Hurling backs